Per Rollum (3 December 1928 – 18 May 2014) was a Norwegian alpine skier.

He was born in Oslo and represented the club IL Heming. He participated at the 1952 Winter Olympics in Oslo, where he placed eighth in slalom. He became Norwegian champion in giant slalom in 1952 and 1953, and in slalom in 1953.

He died in May 2014.

References

1928 births
2014 deaths
Alpine skiers from Oslo
Norwegian male alpine skiers
Olympic alpine skiers of Norway
Alpine skiers at the 1952 Winter Olympics